Racing Club de Roubaix was a French association football team that played in Roubaix, Nord.

History
The team was founded in 1895 and was very successful before the establishment of professionalism in France. In 1933, after losing twice in a row in the final of Coupe de France, this time against city rival Excelsior AC Roubaix (a professional team), the team turned professional and reached Division 1 in 1936 and stayed there till World War II. After the war, the club merged with Excelsior AC Roubaix and US Tourcoing in CO Roubaix-Tourcoing (1945–1963). In 1963, CO Roubaix-Tourcoing lost its professional status and RC Roubaix decided to merge with another club, Stade Roubaix, to create Racing Stade Roubaisien. This team would eventually merge with Roubaix Football (i.e. former Excelsior AC Roubaix) in Stade Club Olympique de Roubaix, a team which ended in 1995 due to financial problems.

Names of the club
1895–1944. Racing Club de Roubaix.
1944–1963. in CO Roubaix-Tourcoing.
1964–1990. Racing Stade Roubaisien.
1990–1995. Stade Club Olympique de Roubaix (SCOR).

Honours
Champion of France USFSA : 1902, 1903, 1904, 1906, 1908.
DH Nord champion : 1923, 1925, 1926, 1930.
Coupe de France : Runner-up 1932, 1933.

Managerial history
Charles Griffiths: 1935–?
Franz Platko: ?

See also
 CO Roubaix-Tourcoing
 Excelsior AC Roubaix

References

External links
 History

Association football clubs established in 1895
Association football clubs disestablished in 1964
Defunct football clubs in France
1895 establishments in France
1964 disestablishments in France
RC Roubaix
Football clubs in Hauts-de-France
Ligue 1 clubs